Beatrice Fang is a Taiwanese actress.

Education
Fang obtained her bachelor's degree in Italian literature from Fu Jen Catholic University.

Filmography

Film

Television series

Personal life
Fang met with her boyfriend Yang Ming-wei in 2014 during the shooting of Dear Mom. In April 2015 Fang was engaged to Yang and in August 2015 she delivered her first baby. On 13 January 2016, Fang married Yang. In June 2017, Fang announced her second child pregnancy.

References

External links
 
 
 

1990 births
21st-century Taiwanese actresses
Living people
Fu Jen Catholic University alumni